Little Rock is an unincorporated community in Bourbon County, Kentucky, United States.

References

Unincorporated communities in Bourbon County, Kentucky
Unincorporated communities in Kentucky